Los Angeles Science Teachers Network is a professional development network for science education by science teachers for science teachers committed to creating the most engaging hands-on curriculum possible through inquiry-based learning and scientific literacy.

History
The first meeting was held in Lisa Ellen Niver's home in September 2009. In October 2013, the professional development network had its fifteenth session. Over seventy teachers and forty schools have been involved to date. In Westside Today, information about teaching, science and LASTN was presented. In the Bill & Melinda Gates Foundation Impatient Optimists article, "Teachers Need A Village," the importance of teachers needing support from groups like LASTN is explored. "Why So Many Of America's Teachers Are Leaving The Profession?" cites Los Angeles Science Teachers Network as an example to teachers everywhere to find support and stay involved.

Advisory Council
Several teachers formed the core group and served as advisors to Niver over the first three years: Susan Bagdasarian, Sasha Moore, Joseph Rose and Judy Weiskopf. Niver was frequently asked about teaching science, she has been quoted in Parenting.com, PBS.org, Green Living Arizona (in print), the Huffington Post and on National television. While Niver is on sabbatical with We Said Go Travel, Susan Bagdasarian has been the director of the network.

List of Participating Schools
Adat Ari El
Animo High School
Berkeley Hall
Brawerman School
Brentwood School
Buckley School
Calvary Christian School
Campbell Hall
Carlthorp
Center for Early Education
Chadwick School
cosee-west
Crossroads School
Curtis School
Destination Science
Echo Horizon
Hillel Hebrew
John Thomas Dye School
Laurence School
Maimonides
Mirman School
New Roads School
Oakwood School
Poly Tech
PS 1
Saint Marks
Seven Arrows
Sinai Akiba
St James School
St Matthews Parish School
Stephen S Wise Temple Elementary School
Temple Israel
Turning Point School
Valley Beth Shalom
Viewpoint School
Village School
Westerly School
Westside Neighborhood School
Wildwood School
Willows
Windward School
Yavneh

See also
Constructivism in science education
National Science Education Standards
National Science Teachers Association
Science Education
Science, Technology, Society and Environment Education
School science technicians
STEM fields
Steve Spangler

References

External links
Resources for Teachers
Websites for Classroom Use
Science Isn't Scary
Facebook
Twitter

Science education in the United States
Academic organizations based in the United States
Educational organizations based in California
Organizations based in Los Angeles
Teacher associations based in the United States
2009 establishments in California
Organizations established in 2009
Education in Los Angeles
Science and technology in Greater Los Angeles